The Rio Nunez (Rio Nuñez) or Nunez River languages constitute a pair of Niger–Congo languages, Mbulungish and Baga Mboteni. They are spoken at the mouth of the Nunez River in Guinea, West Africa.

The Rio Nunez languages have been studied by Fields (2001), but otherwise remain sparsely documented.

Classification
The two Rio Nunez languages do not subgroup with the Nalu language, contrary to prior classifications. Previously, Fields had proposed a Coastal group consisting of Mbulungish, Mboteni, and Nalu that she considered to be distinct from the surrounding Mel languages. The grouping in its current scope was proposed by Güldemann (2018).

The Rio Nunez languages are currently unclassified within Niger-Congo, and whether or not they are part of the Atlantic languages is also uncertain.

History
Speakers of Rio Nunez languages had cultivated African rice (Oryza glaberrima) for thousands of years on the swampy coast of Guinea. Mel speakers were later arrivals on the Guinean coast, as the Proto-Mel homeland is located in the north-central highlands of Sierra Leone just to the south of the Lesser Scarcies River, rather than on the coast (Fields 2008:83).

Today, both languages are endangered. As of 1998, fewer than 100 people spoke Baga Mboteni fluently, while Mbulungish had fewer than 500 speakers, although both speech communities had a few thousand people. The language endangerment is caused by a shift to Susu, a Mande language that is the lingua franca of coastal Guinea (Fields 2008:33-35).

Vocabulary

Basic
Comparison of basic vocabulary words of the Rio Nunez languages, and also Nalu, by Fields (2004):

Comparison of basic vocabulary words of the Rio Nunez languages, and also Nalu, by Wilson (2007):

Vocabulary shared with Atlantic languages:

Innovated vocabulary differing from Atlantic languages:

Some Mbulungish and Mboteni innovated words that differ from Nalu and other surrounding languages (Fields 2008:74):

Cultural
A rich set of rice agriculture-related vocabulary in Rio Nunez languages has been documented by Edda L. Fields-Black (2008).

Areal words borrowed from Mande languages such as Susu (Fields 2008:118, 150-151):

References